Leila Hanipovna Mardanshina (15 May 1927 – 10 September 2017) was a Soviet and Russian oil and gas operator who worked at the No. 2 oil field of the Tuimazaneft Oil Production Department from 1946 to 1985. Mardanshina was awarded the Hero of Socialist Labour, the Order of Lenin, the Order of the Badge of Honour and the Medal "For Distinguished Labour".

Biography
On 15 May 1927, Mardanshina was born in the village of Verkhnemancharovo, Birsky District, Bashkir Autonomous Soviet Socialist Republic (today the Ilishevsky District, Republic of Bashkortostan). She and her family relocated to  soon after she was born. Following her graduation from school after ten years, Mardanshina began working as a teacher at the Kazy-Eldyak elementary school (part of Bayagildin Village Council) in the Dyurtyulinskii District in 1944.

Mardanshina remained at the post until 1985. In 1947, she was appointed operator for oil and gas production and was moved to the company's No. 5 oil field four years later. Mardanshina worked with 16 oil wells as well as maintaining others. She was required to pump the production of oil hourly from the measuring tank to the tanks by hand in an era where this process was not mechanised. At some wells she oversaw, Mardanshina conducted assignments introducing and developing new equipment and field radio dispatching experiments, took part in testing of two new equipment designs developed the by the design bureau of oil instrumentation. She stopped working as an oil and gas production operator in 1971.

Mardanshina served as deputy chair of the trade union committee of the NGDU between 1971 and 1981. She worked to better the role of trade union organisations in collectives' lives, developing competition and disseminating improved practices. Mardanshina was the head of the NGDU's technical office at the Museum of Labour Glory of the Tuymazaneft Oil and Gas Production Department in the House of Technology from 1981. She also had an active role in the social and political scene. She served on the Oktyabrsky City Council of Workers' Deputies. On 10 September 2017, Mardanshina died in Oktyabrsky, Republic of Bashkortostan.

Awards
Mardanshina received high-ranking state awards for her work. On 19 March 1959, she was awarded the Hero of Socialist Labour with the Order of Lenin and the  "for the outstanding successes achieved in the development of the oil and gas industry." Mardanshina received the Order of the Badge of Honour in 1962.

She earned the Honored Oilman of the Bashkir ASSR in 1976 and the Honorary Oilman of the USSR a year later. Mardanshina was awarded the title of Honorary Citizen of the City of Oktyabrsky by the executive committee of the Council of People's Deputies on 14 April 1983 and also earned the Medal "For Distinguished Labour". In 2021, a memorial plaque was unveiled at her place of residence in Oktyabrsky. A street in Oktyabrsky is named for Mardanshina.

References

1927 births
2017 deaths
People from Bashkortostan
20th-century Russian women
21st-century Russian women
Soviet women
Seventh convocation members of the Supreme Soviet of the Soviet Union
Recipients of the Order of Lenin
Heroes of Socialist Labour